Antoni Postius i Terrado (born 11 August 1984) is a Catalan politician and a former member of the Congress of Deputies of Spain.

Early life
Postius was born on 11 August 1984 in Lleida, Catalonia. He was educated at the Joan XXIII and Joc de la Bola public schools and IES Ronda. He has a degree in law from the University of Lleida. He also spent a year at University College Vitus Bering in Horsens, Denmark. He has a degree in law and is a member of the bar association in Lleida. He was head of the local branch of the Nationalist Youth of Catalonia (JNC) (2006–08), president of JNC in Lleida (2008–10) and a member of the JNC's National Executive Committee.

Career

Postius is a computer engineer and was a co-owner of a computer company before joining the family business, Tintorerías Postius.

Postius contested the 2011 local elections as a Convergence and Union (CiU) electoral alliance candidate in Lleida and was elected. He was re-elected at the 2015 local elections.

Postius contested the 2015 general election as a Democracy and Freedom (DiL) electoral alliance candidate in the Province of Lleida and was elected to the Congress of Deputies. He was re-elected at the 2016 general election.

Postius is the Catalan European Democratic Party (PDeCAT)'s mayoral candidate in Lleida at the 2019 local elections. He contested the 2019 local elections as a Together for Catalonia (JxCat) candidate in Lleida and was re-elected though he did not become mayor.

Electoral history

References

1984 births
Catalan European Democratic Party politicians
Convergence and Union politicians
Democratic Convergence of Catalonia politicians
Living people
Members of the 11th Congress of Deputies (Spain)
Members of the 12th Congress of Deputies (Spain)
Municipal councillors in the province of Lleida
People from Lleida
Together for Catalonia (2017) politicians
University of Lleida alumni